Duraković is a surname of Serbo-Croatian language. Notable people with the surname include:

Asaf Duraković (1940-2020), Croatian doctor and poet
Mehmet Duraković (born 1965), Australian football coach and former player
Nijaz Duraković (1949-2012), Bosnian author, professor, and politician
Reuf Duraković (born 1994), Austrian-born Bosnian football goalkeeper

See also
Đurković, surname

Bosnian surnames